Kovelamudi Surya Prakash Rao (1914–1996) was an Indian film director, producer, actor and cinematographer known for his works in Telugu, Kannada, and Hindi films. In 1977 he won the Filmfare Award for Best Director – Kannada for Ganda Hendthi. In 1995, Rao received the Raghupathi Venkaiah Award for his contributions to Telugu cinema. He is the father of noted Telugu director K. Raghavendra Rao and is the uncle of another noted director K. Bapayya.

Filmography

Director 

 Pratibimbalu (2022)
 Rowdy Gaari Pellam (1991)
 Muddula Mogadu (1983)
 Garuda Saukiyama (1982)
 Kotta Neeru (1982)
 Balina Guri (1979)
 Ganda Hendthi (1977)
 Avan Oru Charitram (1976)
 Secretary (1976)
 Suprabhatam (1976)
 Cheekati Velugulu (1975)
 Prem Nagar (1974)
 Kode Nagu (1974)
 Satyaniki Sankellu (1974)
 Ida Lokam (1973)
 Jeevitam (1973)
 Pedda Koduku (1972)
 Vasantha Maligai (1972)
 Bhale Papa (1971)
 Naa Tammudu (1971)
 Prema Nagar (1971)
 Tahsildar Gari Ammayi (1971)
 Vichitra Kutumbam (1969)
 Bandhipotu Dongalu (1968)
 Bharya (1968)
 Harishchandra (1968)
 Stree Janma (1967)
 Badukuva Daari (1966)
 Mohini Rugmangada (1962)
 Gullo Pelli (1961)
 Renukadevi Mahatyam (1960)
 Marumalarchi (1956)
 Melukolupu (1956)
 Ante Kaavaali (1955)
 Balanandam (1954)
 Kanna Talli (1953)
 Petrathai (1953)
 Anni (1951)
 Deeksha (1951)
 Modati Raatri (1950)

Producer 
 Mohini Rugmangada (1962)
 Ante Kavali (1955)
 Kanna Talli (1953)
 Deeksha (1951)
 Modati Rathri (1950)
 Drohi (1948)
 Gruhapravesam (1946)

Actor 
 Apavadu (1941)
 Patni (1942)
 Drohi (1948)

Awards
 He won Nandi Award for Best Story Writer for 1968 film Bandipotu Dongalu.

References

External links 
 

1914 births
1996 deaths
20th-century Indian dramatists and playwrights
20th-century Indian film directors
20th-century Indian photographers
Cinematographers from Andhra Pradesh
Film people from Andhra Pradesh
Film producers from Andhra Pradesh
Filmfare Awards South winners
Hindi-language film directors
Kannada film directors
Nandi Award winners
People from Krishna district
Tamil film directors
Telugu film cinematographers
Telugu film directors